Matthew Best may refer to:

 Matthew Best (Royal Navy officer) (1878–1940), British navy officer
 Matthew Best (conductor) (born 1957), English bass singer and conductor, especially of vocal music